State Route 242 (SR 242) is a  north-south state highway that lies mostly in Lawrence County, Tennessee. It connects Iron City with Henryville via Westpoint and Lawrenceburg.

Route description

SR 242 begins in Lawrence County in Iron City at an intersection with SR 227. It heads north as Wayland Springs Road to temporarily cross into Wayne County before returning to Lawrence County and leaving Iron City to wind its way northeast through mountains, running parallel to Shoal Creek. It then crosses over Factory Creek to pass through Westpoint before winding its way through some more mountains as West Point Road. The highway then enters farmland shortly before entering Lawrenceburg at an interchange with US 64/SR 15. SR 242 turns northward to pass through some neighborhoods before coming to an intersection and becoming concurrent with US 64 Business (W Gaines Street). They head east along the southern end of David Crockett State Park before crossing Shoal Creek and entering downtown, where SR 242 splits off and heads north along Buffalo Road. SR 242 passes by some neighborhoods and businesses before leaving Lawrenceburg and passing through farmland. The highway then splits off onto Henryville Road and heads northwest through rural areas before entering Henryville and coming to an end at an intersection with SR 240.

Major intersections

References

242
Transportation in Lawrence County, Tennessee
Transportation in Wayne County, Tennessee